Phryganopsis is a genus of moths in the subfamily Arctiinae.

Species
 Phryganopsis alberici 	Dufrane, 1945
 Phryganopsis angulifascia (Strand, 1912)
 Phryganopsis asperatella (Walker, 1864)
 Phryganopsis atrescens Hampson, 1903
 Phryganopsis cinerella (Wallengren, 1860)
 Phryganopsis continentalis Kühne, 2010 
 Phryganopsis flavicosta Hampson, 1901
 Phryganopsis gilvapatagia Kühne, 2010
 Phryganopsis interstiteola Hampson, 1914
 Phryganopsis kinuthiae Kühne, 2007
 Phryganopsis parasordida Kühne, 2007
 Phryganopsis plumosa 	Mabille, 1900
 Phryganopsis punctilineata (Hampson, 1901)
 Phryganopsis sordida Felder, 1874
 Phryganopsis subasperatella 	Strand, 1912
 Phryganopsis tenuisparsa Kühne, 2010

Former species
 Phryganopsis hemiphaea Hampson, 1909
 Phryganopsis tryphosa 	Kiriakoff, 1958

References
 Felder & Rogenhofer. Reise öst. Fregatte Novara (Zool.) 2 (Abt. 2): pl. 106, fig. 30.
 Kühne, L. (2007). Esperiana Buchreihe zur Entomologie Memoir 3: 353-394.
 afromoths

Lithosiini
Moth genera